Otar Gordeli (November 18, 1928 – December 6, 1994) was a composer in the country of Georgia.

Gordeli was born in Tbilisi, Georgia. He was educated at the Tbilisi State Conservatory.

Works 

 Piano Quintet (1950)
 Piano Concerto in C minor, op. 2 (1952): LP Melodiya D 015189-90: Moscow Radio SO, A. Gauk (cond), A. Iokheles (piano)
 Festivities Overture
 Concerto in D Major for flute and orchestra, op. 8 (1959): LP Melodiya D 015189-90: Moscow Radio Orchestra, Y. Svetlanov (cond), A. Korbeyev (flute)
 Piano Sonata (1960)
 And furthermore: Choruses, Incidental music, Instrumental music, Romances

Notes and references 

 Most of the information was found from this website.
 

Composers from Georgia (country)
1928 births
1994 deaths
Musicians from Tbilisi
20th-century composers